Montažstroj (stylized MONTAЖ$TROJ) is an art collective which creates "socially engaged projects" in theatre, dance, music, visual and audio-visual arts.

Montažstroj, Croatian neologism, a compound of the word „montage“ meaning fusion, film and video editing, as well as working on the assembly line, and the word „machine“, in the sense of futuristic ideal from the beginning of the 20th century, applied to all types of art but also in the sense of order and discipline. Their artistic expression is constructed through interdisciplinary interventions in music, film, visual, video and digital arts.
Since its formation in 1989 Montažstroj is creating art programatically responsible for the community from which it forms. Montažstroj received international attention and became a company of dance and physical theatre with prominence in recognition and awards early on. The founder and artistic director of Montažstroj, Borut Šeparović, led the organization to becoming a distinguished both in Croatia and abroad. Collective performed in more than 20 European countries and United States of America.

Football and pop culture

The initial 7 years Montažstroj's work was concentrated on the theatrical representation of the football and pop culture. In those years the collective produced several performances, installations, award-winning videos and choreographic works. The experience of real socialism, the historical changes occurring in post-communism and the war in former Yugoslavia, influenced and defined Montažstroj's unique artistic actions. The material for performance was found in everyday events and often led to the radical stage reality. After the first professional productions'VATROTEHNA', performed in 1990 in an abandoned area of the old distillery Badel and 'RAP OPERA 101', adaptations of antic myths in the context of global satellite programs and local war surrounding, Montažstroj came into worldview in 1991, with their music video 'CROATIA IN FLAME' - a direct artistic engagement in the service of homeland. Artistic actions continued with interpretations of post‐communist transitional myths and Montažstroj was labeled as the theater of transition.

Performinguit

In 1997, Montažstroj started working on its long‐term objective - building an international company with a strong artistic identity, unbound by a particular culture. Operating predominantly in Netherlands under the name Performingunit, the group focused on the position of the individual, and identity problems, attempting to avoid spectacular theatrical elements and highlighting the presence of performers as the main component of the production. In this period Montažstroj's performances were more intimate and they produced works such as 'TERRIBLE FISH' based on Sylvia Plath’s poetry, ‘WHO IS WOYZECK?’ based on Büchner's canonic text Western Theater and ‘THE ENCYCLOPEDIA OF THE DEAD’ based on a story by Danilo Kiš.

Interdisciplinary projects

Montažstroj's projects ‘T‐FORMANCE’, ‘T‐FAKTOR’ and ‘THIS IS THE THEATER YOU DESERVE’ were multimedia interactive events, which explored the phenomenon of terrorism. Special emphasis was put on the use of new media.
In 2008 Montažstroj and its director Borut Šeparović produced ‘TIMBUKTU’, an engaged performance for youth which dealt with humanization of the animal.

Social engagement

‘MY HEART BEATS FOR HER' in 2010 presented what seemed to be two unrelated subjects – football and unemployed women. This was a reconstruction of the spectacular Croatian victory over England, resulting in 3:2 at the Wembley Stadium on November 21st, 2007. The same year Montažstroj produced VATROTEHNA 2.0. trying to review social changes that happened in Croatia for the past ten years. 
‘THE FUTURE IS NOW’ 2013 is a performance from 2013.

'UPRISING YOUTH' (2014) was a dance performance.

What followed in 2014 was a project named ‘LITTLE MAN WANTS TO CROSS THE LINE’ (LMWCL) inspired by a cult Yugoslav new wave album ‘Paket aranžman’.

Montažstroj's new video ‘COMMUNISM’ is currently being broadcast on MTV. The video is a fragment of the multimedia project 'WHERE'S THE REVOLUTION, SCUM?'

Film

The project 'COUNTERATTACK' (2013, still in pre-production) tackles the issue of landmines in the context of environmental pollution and war repercussions that continue to destroy and kill people decades after the war. Dancers will step into the mine fields and see if the danger is still present and lying hidden in the ground. COUNTERATTACK is a project in which dance is more than art and every step a matter of life and death. The project is pointing out the aspect of the mine problem and the engaged role of audio-visual and performing arts.

About Borut Šeparović

Borut Šeparović was born in Zagreb, Croatia in 1967. He graduated in Philosophy and Comparative Literature at the Faculty of Humanities and Social Sciences of the University of Zagreb, and from the graduate school at Das Arts (Advanced Studies in Performance Arts) in Amsterdam.

Performances

1990.	FIRE-TECHNICS 
(text ‘Prometheus Bound’ by Aeschylus), Montazstroj, Zagreb

1991.	RAP OPERA 101 
(text ‘Philoktetes’ by Sophocles & H. Mueller), 
Montazstroj, Zagreb; co-production: festival Eurokaz, Zagreb

1993.	ENJOY MONTAZSTROJ!
(dance performance), Montazstroj, Zagreb

1994. 	EVERYBODY GOES 2 DISCO FROM MOSCOW 2 SAN FRANCISCO 
(dance performance), Montazstroj, Zagreb

1995. 	DISCO RE-MIX 
(dance performance), Montazstroj, Zagreb

1996.	EURO-BODY 
(dance performance), Montazstroj, Zagreb

1997.	EXERCISES MOBILE sections + CONVERTIBLE sections 
(work-in-progress), Montazstroj, Zagreb with different partners

1999.	FRAGILE 
(dance performance), Montazstroj, Zagreb & Performingunit, Breda; 
co-production: Intercult, B.I.T., Frascati
 
2000.	DUET 
(dance performance), Performingunit, Breda

2001.	TRUTH OR DARE? 
(performance), Performingunit, Breda; 
co-production: Chasse Theater Breda, Frascati Amsterdam
  
2001.	TERRIBLE FISH 
(performance based on poem “Three Women” by Sylvia Plath), Performingunit, Breda

2002.	WHO IS? WOYZECK 
(based on “Woyzeck” by Georg Buchner), Performingunit, Breda

2004.	ENCYCLOPEDIA OF THE DEAD  
(based on story “Encyclopedia of the dead” by Danilo Kiš), Montazstroj, Zagreb
 
2007. 	T-FORMANCE 
(interactive performance), Montazstroj, Zagreb, co-production: Teatar &TD, Zagreb

2007. THE THEATER YOU DESERVE
(interactive event), Montazstroj, Zagreb, co-production: Teatar &TD, Zagreb

2008.  TIMBUKTU 
(theatre, participatory project), Montazstroj, Zagreb; co-production: Zagreb Puppet Theatre Travno, Zagreb

2009.  I F*** ON THE FIRST DATE
(theatre, project on location, participatory project), Montazstroj, Zagreb

2009. ZAGREB BY NIGHT
(theatre, project on location, action), Montazstroj, Zagreb; co-production:  Banana Guerilla, Zagreb

2009.  T-FACTOR
(theatre, project on location, participatory project), Montazstroj, Zagreb; co-production: Festival Perforacije, Zagreb, Rijeka, Dubrovnik

2010.  MY HEART BEATS FOR HER
(theatre, dance) Montazstroj, Zagreb; co-production: Tala Dance Center, Zagreb

2010.  FIRE-TECHNICS 2.0
(theatre), Montazstroj, Zagreb; co-production: Zagreb Youth Theater, Zagreb, Performance Arts Week Perforacije, Zagreb & Operacija: Grad, Zagreb

2011.  SAMPLE
(theatre, performance, dance), Montazstroj, Zagreb

2012.  55+
(theatre, video project), Montazstroj, Zagreb

2013.  THE FUTURE IS NOW
(theatre, participative project), Montazstroj, Zagreb

2014.  THE UPRISING YOUTH
(theatre, dance), MONTAЖ$TROJ, Zagreb; co-production: Zagreb centre for independent culture and youth – Pogon, Zagreb, Artistic organization Counterattack, Zagreb

2014.  LMWCL
(media project, audio project, video project, theatre), Montazstroj, Zagreb

2014.  WHERE'S THE REVOLUTION, SCUM?
(theatre, audio project, video project), Montazstroj, Zagreb

Crossover 

1989. 		THE FOOTBALL BOOT IN THE ART GALLERY (action / performance)

1990. 		ACHTUNG ALARM (action / performance)

1991. 		CROATIA IN FLAME (video clip)

1991. 		HOP & RAS, DVA (installation / performance)

1991. 		ATLETA SRCA vs. BARBAROGENIJE (action)

1992. 		MONTAZSTROJ LIVE! (music performance / concert)

1995. 		NO DISTANCE (action / street performance)

2009. THE FOOTBALL BOOT IN THE MUSEUM (action / performance / project on location)

2010. ACHTUNG ALARM! 2.0 (action / performance / project on location)

2010. FIRESTARTER (action / performance / project on location)

2010. B.D.L.2.0 (action / performance / project on location)

2011. CROATIAN CREATION - MONTAZSTROJ CALLS FOR WITNESSES (media project / exhibition)

2013. COUNTERATTACK (video project / dance)

2014. CONSUMED (video project / media project)

2014. SWASTIKA (media project / audio project / video project)

2014. COMMUNISM (media project / audio project / video project)

2014. RABIES (media project / audio project / video project)

Theatre in Croatia
Documentary film organizations
Croatian musical groups
Culture in Zagreb
Dance organizations
Croatian contemporary artists